The Nicholas Cocaigne House is a historic house and farm complex located at Cape Vincent in Jefferson County, New York.

Description and history 
The limestone farmhouse was built in 1839 and has three sections: a -story, three-bay main block; a single-story rear wing; and a one-story gabled, wooden ell off the wing. Modifications of the house in the 1920s introduced Colonial Revival details. Also on the property is a mid-19th-century barn and three sheds.

It was listed on the National Register of Historic Places on September 27, 1985.

References

Houses on the National Register of Historic Places in New York (state)
Colonial Revival architecture in New York (state)
Houses completed in 1839
Houses in Jefferson County, New York
National Register of Historic Places in Jefferson County, New York